Lysipomia sparrei is a species of plant in the family Campanulaceae. It is endemic to Ecuador.  Its natural habitats are subtropical or tropical high-altitude shrubland and subtropical or tropical high-altitude grassland. It is threatened by habitat loss.

References

sparrei
Endemic flora of Ecuador
Endangered plants
Taxonomy articles created by Polbot